Gerardo Joaquín Torres Herrera (born 14 March 1977) is a Mexican footballer. He made his debut with the Atlas de Guadalajara in 1997.

Atlas de Guadalajara
He made his debut with Atlas in 1997.

Tecos UAG
With Tecos UAG, he mainly played with reserve team at Primera División A.

Caracas FC
After 11 years of successful soccer in Mexico, Torres was signed by the Venezuelan club Caracas FC, realizing his dream of playing abroad. He also played for Mérida F.C. in September 2009 before retired.

External links
 
 
 

1977 births
Living people
Mexico under-20 international footballers
Mexican expatriate footballers
Mexican footballers
Liga MX players
Atlas F.C. footballers
Atlético Morelia players
Tecos F.C. footballers
C.F. Mérida footballers
Expatriate footballers in Venezuela
Association football defenders
Footballers from Yucatán
Sportspeople from Mérida, Yucatán